State Route 613 (SR 613), better known as Summerlin Parkway, is a freeway in the western portion of the city of Las Vegas, Nevada, connecting Clark County Route 215 (CC 215) to U.S. Route 95 (US 95) and serving the master planned community of Summerlin.

Route description

SR 613 begins at a signalized junction with access ramps to the Las Vegas Beltway (CC 215). The road becomes a full freeway just east of the intersection, and maintains this status as it heads eastward through Summerlin and Las Vegas. The freeway terminates at the interchange with Rainbow Boulevard (SR 595) and US 95, locally known as the "Rainbow Curve" interchange.

History
Summerlin Parkway was initially constructed by the developers of Summerlin through the Summerlin Homeowners Association. The first construction along the parkway, completed in 1989, consisted of rebuilding the US 95 interchange and constructing the divided highway west to Town Center Drive. Later projects funded by the Regional Transportation Commission of Southern Nevada brought freeway interchanges to Buffalo Drive in 1992 and Rampart Boulevard in 1994.

By 2000, Summerlin Parkway was built up to expressway standards to a western end at Anasazi Drive and by 2004 the expressway terminated at the Las Vegas Beltway. A half-interchange was added at Durango Drive by 2005 and the Anasazi Drive intersection was converted to an interchange by 2006. Also in 2005, the Nevada Department of Transportation (NDOT) had reconstructed the US 95/Rainbow Boulevard interchange as part of its US 95 widening project (including a new direct connection from eastbound Summerlin Parkway to US 95 north which was not constructed in 1989).

An HOV flyover has been constructed in order to facilitate HOV movements between Summerlin Parkway and US 95 heading to and from downtown. The direct connection ramps opened in July 2012, even though Summerlin Parkway does not yet have HOV lanes.

In 2016, the City of Las Vegas installed a median cable barrier system in the median of Summerlin Parkway. The $2 million project was designed to reduce impacts from drivers losing control of vehicles into the landscaped median and prevent crossover collisions.

In Spring 2017, several operational improvements along Summerlin Parkway were completed. The HOV lanes from US 95 were extended westward from Buffalo Drive to Durango Drive and new auxiliary lanes were completed westbound to Rampart Boulevard, both directions between Rampart Boulevard and Town Center Drive and eastbound between the CC 215 interchange and Anasazi Drive.

By January 2019, maintenance responsibility for Summerlin Parkway had been transferred from the City of Las Vegas to the Nevada Department of Transportation; NDOT designated the freeway as State Route 613.

Exit list

See also

References

External links

 
 Summerlin Parkway @ AARoads

Freeways in the United States
613
Summerlin, Nevada
Transportation in Clark County, Nevada
Transportation in the Las Vegas Valley